Rachmaninoff Glacier is a glacier flowing south from the Monteverdi Peninsula on Alexander Island, into Britten Inlet. It was named by the USSR Academy of Sciences in 1987 after Sergei Rachmaninoff (1873-1943), the Russian composer.

References

Glaciers of Alexander Island